Roberto "Robbie" Pecorari (born May 12, 1987) is an American racing driver from Aston, Pennsylvania.

One of America's most successful young karters, he won numerous regional and national World Karting Association and Stars of Karting championships before moving up to cars in late 2003. In 2004 he competed in numerous open-wheel developmental series, including Skip Barber Formula Dodge, where he finished fifth in series points. and the Star Mazda Series. In 2005 he competed in Star Mazda full-time and finished second in the championship, winning two races and rookie of the year honors.

In 2006 he competed in the Champ Car Atlantic Series for Gelles Racing, winning at Toronto and finishing 11th in points. For 2007 he moved to the rival Indy Pro Series driving for Team KMA Racing  where he finished eighth in points with one win at Nashville Superspeedway. The series changed names to the Firestone Indy Lights Series for 2008 and Pecorari was left without a full-time ride. After missing the first race, Pecorari drove for 3 different teams on a part-time schedule, making 12 starts with a runner-up finish at Kansas Speedway and finished 16th in points. In April 2009 he participated in an A1 Grand Prix Rookie Driver test session for A1 Team USA.

Complete motorsports results

American Open-Wheel racing results
(key) (Races in bold indicate pole position, races in italics indicate fastest race lap)

USF2000 National Championship results

Star Mazda Championship

Atlantic Championship

Indy Lights

External links

References

1987 births
Living people
Indy Lights drivers
Atlantic Championship drivers
A1 Grand Prix Rookie drivers
Indy Pro 2000 Championship drivers
Formula BMW USA drivers
American Le Mans Series drivers
People from Delaware County, Pennsylvania
Racing drivers from Pennsylvania
U.S. F2000 National Championship drivers
World Karting Association drivers
Walker Racing drivers